Hugh Holbeche, DCL was a 15th-century priest.

He held the living of Llanengan, was a Prebendary of LIchfield; and Dean of St Asaph from 1404 until his death in 1417.

References 

15th-century Welsh clergy
Deans of St Asaph
1417 deaths